Eudaemonia is a genus of moths in the family Saturniidae. They are native to Sub-Saharan Africa and have remarkable, extremely elongated "tails" on the hindwings.

Species
The genus includes the following species:

 Eudaemonia argiphontes Maassen, 1877
 Eudaemonia argus (Fabricius, 1777)
 Eudaemonia troglophylla Hampson, 1919

References
 Eudaemonia at Markku Savela's Lepidoptera and Some Other Life Forms
Natural History Museum Lepidoptera genus database